Lee Garnett Day (May 5, 1890-May 24, 1968) was an American explorer, Army officer, and executive of General Foods.(25 May 1968). Lee Garnett Day, Explorer, was 78; Retired Executive of General Foods, Ex-Colonel, Dies, The New York Times, p. 35 (paywall)

Day was the son of Henry Mason Day, and graduated from Yale University in 1911.  His explorations primarily consisted of trek with Alfred M. Collins to South America in 1915 along with staff from Yale University and the Field Museum.(29 December 1914). Off to Explore Unknown Jungles, Brattleboro Daily Reformer   He served in France during World War I.  He later became vice-president of Baker-Bennett-Day, Inc. a General Foods subsidiary.  He left that position in 1940 and returned to the Army.

His wife Nancy Sales Day predeceased him, and he was survived by a daughter and six grandchildren.

References

External links
Lee Garnett Day and Nancy Sayles Day papers - Brown University Library

1890 births
1968 deaths
Explorers of the United States
General Foods
Yale University alumni
American military personnel of World War I
United States Army personnel of World War II